A Department of Antiquities is a government department with responsibility for cultural heritage management, archaeological research and regulating antiquities trading in some countries. Many were established by British and French colonial administrations in the mandate period and continued by their postcolonial successor states, sometimes under a different name. They include:

 The Department of Antiquities of Cyprus
 The Department of Antiquities of Iraq
 The Department of Antiquities of Jordan
 The Department of Antiquities of Mandatory Palestine, which was succeeded by the:
 Israel Antiquities Authority, known as the Department of Antiquities until 1990
 Palestinian Department of Antiquities, reestablished in 1994
 The Division of Antiquities of Tanzania
 The Ministry of Tourism and Antiquities of Egypt, and its predecessor the Supreme Council of Antiquities, known as the Department of Antiquities until 1971

See also
Directorate-General of Antiquities and Museums, Syria

References